Cordes may refer to:

Places
 Cordes (river), river of ancient Syria (now in Turkey)
 Cordes, Arizona, United States
 Cordes, Wallonia, in Frasnes-lez-Anvaing, Belgium
 Cordes-sur-Ciel, Tarn, France

People
 Attrell Cordes (1970–2016), American rapper and musician
 Baltazar de Cordes (16th century–17th century), Dutch corsair
 Burkhard Cordes (born 1939), Brazilian sailor
 Charlott Cordes (born 1988), German model
 Colin Cordes, New Zealand rower
 Gloria Cordes (born 1931), American baseball player
 Jill Cordes (born 1969), American television personality
 John Cordes (1890–?), American police detective
 Kevin Cordes (born 1993), American swimmer
 Manfred Cordes (born 1953), German conductor
 Marcel Cordes (1920–1992), German baritone
 Nancy Cordes  (fl. since 1990s), American journalist
 Otto Cordes (1905–1970), German water polo player 
 Paul Josef Cordes (born 1934), German Catholic cardinal
 Tim Cordes, American physician
 Ulrich Cordes (born 1980), German tenor